The Man in Seat Sixty-One is a travel website written and maintained by Mark Smith, a former rail industry worker. The website focuses almost exclusively on train-based travel, with occasional ferry recommendations. The site has won several awards, including "Best Travel Website" in the Guardian & Observer Travel Awards in 2008. The Man in Seat Sixty-One provides information on the best routes, fares and times for journeys from the UK to most of Europe, and for rail travel within most countries in the rest of the world, including exhaustive coverage of the Indian Railways and the Russian Railways.

History
The site is a personal project run by Mark Smith, formerly a manager in the rail industry. The site is called Seat 61 after his preferred seat in First Class on the Eurostar. He began the site as a hobby in 2001, after frustration with the difficulty he perceived in finding how to book rail tickets within Europe. In September 2007 he gave up his job working for the Department for Transport to run the website full-time.

Current
The site now receives more than one million visitors a month and Smith has released a book, also titled The Man in Seat Sixty-One offering advice based on his travels. Nearly all of the information compiled in the site is based on his own travels and experiences, and it includes in-depth guides on booking rail tickets within Europe, as well as information on booking rail travel to and within other areas of the world, including exhaustive coverage of the Indian Railways and the Russian Railways.

The success of the site has led to Smith being interviewed for various travel media, including BBC Radio 4's Traveller's Tree, The Sunday Telegraph, The Sunday Times and The Guardian.

Smith opposes airline transport as part of travel, citing the increased environmental friendliness of train travel, as well as the ability to view scenery, such as the Austrian Alps, up close whilst travelling. He also prefers slow compartmentalised sleepers to high-speed trains but regularly travels in both ways, and believes they are the future of international travel. He has recommended travelling from London to Dublin by train and ferry (via Holyhead) instead of flying, and has promoted SailRail tickets as a more affordable way to travel between the two cities.

In 2010, Guerrilla Films planned a TV series based on the website.  A pilot episode featuring actor Kenneth Cranham was released covering the journey from London to St Petersburg by rail as far as Waterloo, Belgium .

In 2021, Smith was one of the first passengers on Lumo's East Coast Main Line services.

Awards
 "Best Travel Website", Guardian & Observer Travel Awards 2008
 "Best Personal Contribution", First Choice Responsible Tourism Awards 2006
 "14th Best Travel Website", The Independent''s 50 Best Travel Websites

References

External links 

The Man in Seat Sixty-One

British travel websites